Emam Rural District is a rural district (dehestan) in Ziviyeh District, Saqqez County, Kurdistan Province, Iran. At the 2006 census, its population was 4,697, in 1,005 families. The rural district has 23 villages.

References 

Rural Districts of Kurdistan Province
Saqqez County